Michael Hill (7 August 1672 – 1699) was a politician in England and Ireland.

Biography
He was the son of William Hill, of Hillsborough by his wife Eleanor, daughter of Archbishop Michael Boyle.

Michael Hill was Member of Parliament for Saltash in the English House of Commons from 1692 to 1695, and for Hillsborough in the Irish House of Commons from 1695 to 1699. He also served as Governor and Custos Rotulorum of County Down and appointed to the Privy Council of Ireland in 1694.

Family
In 1690, he married Anne, daughter of Sir John Trevor; they had two sons and one daughter. His eldest son and heir Trevor was made Viscount Hillsborough. Through his second son, Arthur Hill-Trevor, 1st Viscount Dungannon, he is great-grandfather of Arthur Wellesley, 1st Duke of Wellington.

Notes

References
.

1672 births
1699 deaths
People from County Down
Irish MPs 1695–1699
Members of the pre-1707 English Parliament for constituencies in Cornwall
Members of the Privy Council of Ireland
Michael
English MPs 1690–1695
Members of the Parliament of Ireland (pre-1801) for County Down constituencies